Chua Jim Neo (1905 – 8 August 1980) was a Singaporean chef and cookbook writer best known for Mrs. Lee's Cookbook, which preserves the recipes of Peranakan cuisine. Chua was also the mother of Lee Kuan Yew, the first Prime Minister of Singapore.

Biography 
Chua was born in Singapore in 1905 to Chua Kim Teng, a wealthy local businessman, and Leong Ah Soon, a Chinese Indonesian of Hakka descent. While her father was born in Singapore, her paternal grandfather came from a Hokkien Peranakan family in Malacca with ancestry from Haicheng, Zhangzhou, Fujian. Her parents arranged a marriage for her to a storekeeper, named Lee Chin Koon, and they married when she was fifteen.  Chua had five children and her oldest son was Lee Kuan Yew, who went on to become the first Prime Minister of Singapore. Chua saved her family jewelry and money, managing household finances and helping Kuan Yew attend law school in Britain.

In 1974, she wrote Mrs. Lee's Cookbook: Nonya Recipes and Other Favorite Recipes in order to preserve the heritage of Peranakan cuisine (also known as nyonya or nyonya/baba cuisine), which combines Straits Chinese cooking with Malay-style cooking. Chua, a nyonya (Peranakan Chinese woman), was considered a "highly respected authority" on the subject. The original publication included a preface by her cousin Wee Kim Wee, who was then serving as the high commissioner to Malaysia and would later become President of Singapore. The cookbook was updated and republished in 2003 by her granddaughter, Lee Shermay.

Chua died on 8 August 1980, and was cremated at the Mount Vernon Columbarium. She was inducted posthumously in to the Singapore Women's Hall of Fame in 2015.

References 

1905 births
1980 deaths
20th-century Singaporean writers
20th-century women writers
Cookbook writers
Lee family (Singapore)
Peranakan people in Singapore
Singaporean chefs
Singaporean people of Hokkien descent
Singaporean women writers